Charles J Berkel Memorial Stadium (Saint Mary Field, Berkel Stadium) is a sport stadium in Leavenworth, Kansas.  The facility is primarily used by the Saint Mary Spires football, soccer, and track and field teams.  The stadium is also used by several local high schools and for other community events.

External links
 Saint Mary Spires Athletic Facilities Official website

References

College football venues
Sports venues in Kansas
Buildings and structures in Leavenworth, Kansas
American football venues in Kansas
Sports venues completed in 2017
Soccer venues in Kansas
College soccer venues in the United States
Athletics (track and field) venues in Kansas
2017 establishments in Kansas
University of Saint Mary